W239BV is a Classic Country formatted broadcast radio station licensed to Winchester, Virginia and serves Frederick County, Virginia.  W239BV simulcasts sister station WKSI-FM's HD2 feed.  W239BV is owned and operated by iHeartMedia.

Programming
On May 24, 2013, former owner Liberty University began the process of moving the station's transmitting tower, which hadn't been built at this point, to the same tower as Clear Channel station WKSI-FM.  At the time, the station was licensed as W242BG and was to broadcast on 96.3 FM.

On August 2, 2013, Liberty University filed an application and an Asset Purchase Agreement with the Federal Communications Commission (FCC) to begin the sale of W242BG to Clear Channel.  W242BG was sold for $5,000.00 in exchange for Liberty's use of "the HD3 channel of Station WUSQ-FM" for a "period of eight years from [the date of the] execution" of the sale.  Liberty would also be given the right to lease tower space on the WUSQ tower at no charge.

On August 22, 2013, Clear Channel filed an application moving the station from 96.3 FM to 95.7 FM.  The callsign was changed on the same date.

W239BV launched on August 22, 2013 and began airing a hot adult contemporary format, simulcasting the HD2 subchannel of station WKSI-FM.  WKSI-HD2, and in turn W239BV, aired the "Today's Mix" format, one of Clear Channel's Premium Choice formats.

On November 1, 2013, W239BV switched its format from hot adult contemporary to a seasonal all-Christmas music format, with the "Mix 95-7" branding remaining.  The station switched back to hot adult contemporary on December 26.

Until December 26, 2020, at 12 Midnight, when W239BV took over the Classic Country format, which had been abandoned by crosstown competitor WXBN ahead of sister-station WINC-FM's sale and format change, as "Classic Country 95-7".

References

External links
 Classic Country 95.7 Online
 

Classic country radio stations in the United States
239BV
Radio stations established in 2007
IHeartMedia radio stations